Arthur Thurman (September 27, 1879 – May 31, 1919) was an American racecar driver.  Thurman was killed in the 1919 Indianapolis 500; his riding mechanic Nicholas Molinaro survived critical injuries.

Indianapolis 500 results

See also 
List of fatalities at the Indianapolis Motor Speedway

References

External links 

1879 births
1919 deaths
People from Walker County, Georgia
Racing drivers from Georgia (U.S. state)
Indianapolis 500 drivers
AAA Championship Car drivers
Racing drivers who died while racing
Sports deaths in Indiana